Rasmus Henning (born 13 November 1975, in Copenhagen) is an athlete from Denmark, who competes in triathlon. He competed at the second Olympic triathlon at the 2004 Summer Olympics in which he placed seventh with a total time of 1:52:37.32. He competed in the 2008 Summer Olympics as well, placing eighth in the triathlon competition with a time of 1:49:57.47. In International Triathlon Union competition, he recorded a second-place finish at the 2001 ITU Long Distance Triathlon World Championships.

Henning retired from triathlon as a professional in 2012 following the 2012 Ironman World Championship. In his reasons for retiring, Henning cited the desire to retire on his own terms, particularly as injuries began to mount and as he tried to strike a balance between sport and family. He continues to participate in endurance sports and runs a company called Tri Nordic.

References

Danish male triathletes
1975 births
Living people
Olympic triathletes of Denmark
Triathletes at the 2004 Summer Olympics
Triathletes at the 2008 Summer Olympics
Duathletes
Sportspeople from Copenhagen